Numerix is an American financial technology limited liability company. It is headquartered in New York City with nineteen offices worldwide.

The company develops multi-asset class analytics and scalable software for risk management, trading, valuations and pricing for both sell-side and buyside market participants. It is in front-office risk technology and cross-asset analytics for OTC derivatives, structured products and variable annuities, providing software and services for structuring, pre-trade pricing, trade capture and valuation.

Approximately 700 clients and 90 partners across more than 26 different countries use software developed by Numerix. Its partners include MathWorks, Broadridge, Nomura Research Institute, Oracle, ICE Data Services, Tradition Market Data, ActiveViam, Microsoft and Amazon Web Services etc.

After making a major investment in the company, Greg Whitten invested an additional US$32 million in 2001. In turn, Steven O'Hanlon has been CEO of Numerix since January 2013 and COO since 2004.

In August 2022, Numerix was acquired by Genstar Capital.

History 
Numerix was founded in 1996 by Alexander Sokol, Nigel Goldenfeld, Mitchell Feigenbaum and Michael Goodkin as a software company selling multi-asset class pricing tool kits. Numerix CrossAsset remains as one of the industry's most comprehensive collection of models offering full portfolio coverage and broad instrument support for fixed income/rates, equity, FX, credit, commodities, inflation, longevity, volatility and hybrids.

Numerix CrossAsset is used to price financial derivatives and calculate risk analytics – ranging from credit risk, market risk, stress testing, back testing, scenario generation and risk reporting.

Shortly after the financial crisis, Numerix expanded its offerings to risk solutions that evolve around a standard set of pricing analytics.

Numerix continued to grow and build out its front office XVA adjustments for pre-trade pricing, as well as counterparty credit risk exposures and market risk measures. In 2016, it introduced Oneview, its flagship risk management software, which is a real-time, front and middle office platform with a microservices' architecture, designed for pre-trade pricing, post-trade valuations, XVAs, counterparty risk, market risk, margin and capital calculations.

Competitors 
Numerix’ direct competitors are SunGard-FastVal, MSCI, Quantifi, swissQuant and Pricing Partners a Thomson Reuters company.

References

Software companies based in New York (state)
Financial software companies
Software companies of the United States
2022 mergers and acquisitions